eYeka (Listeni/ aj kɑ) is an online crowdsourcing and co-creation platform that allows brands to announce and conduct contests through the Internet. Companies create sets of questions, called "community briefs" or "call-for-entries", to which people can respond to by submitting visual creations. This allows companies to gather creative ideas for marketing or innovation purposes.

Development 

eYeka was founded in Paris, France, in 2006 by Gilles Babinet and Frank Perrier as an online platform that enabled brands, media, content owners and mobile operators to operate their own contributive media . The name "eYeka" was chosen as the combination of the English word "eye" and the Egyptian word, "ka", meaning spirit. The company received its seed funding of €5 million from Ventech, DN Capital and SFR Developpement. The French venture capital firm, I-Source became an investor in January 2010, and eYeka raised €3 million in its second round of financing. In 2010, eYeka opened offices in London, United Kingdom, and Singapore.

Over time, eYeka's focus changed from operating user-generated content channels to hosting creative contests online.  Since 2008, eYeka has exclusively hosted online co-creation contests for brands, non-for-profit or public organizations. Its first community participants were photographers and videomakers. By December 2010, eYeka  had about 100,000 members Companies use the material posted by the members to guide new product development, to gather marketing and/or to obtain user-generated content.

In early 2011, eYeka launched in San Francisco and New York City, and increased its membership to about 150,000. In late 2011, Japanese advertising agency Asatsu-DK acquired exclusive distribution rights of eYeka's platform in Japan. The company's sales increased about 80% in 2011, and eYeka secured a venture loan through Generis Capital Partners for expansion into Brazil, Mexico and Korea.

In 2011, eYeka launched an online interface called "beYond" which allows client organizations to initiate, find, manage and share crowdsourcing projects.

In April 2012, eYeka was selected as a winner of the Red Herring's Top 100 Europe Award. Also in 2012 eYeka organized a contest to support UNESCO's World Press Freedom Day.

In 2015, eYeka was a privately held, venture-backed firm based in Paris, with offices in Singapore and London. The company employs about 50 people, By this time it had posted about than 400 contests.  That year it hosted about than 200,000 content creators from 94 countries as well as a number of corporate clients.

References

External links 

eYeka.net (corporate website)
eYeka.com (community platform)

Companies established in 2001
Companies based in Paris
Crowdsourcing